Union City High School may refer to:

 Union City Community High School in Union City, Indiana
 Union City High School (Michigan) in Union City, Michigan
 Union City High School (New Jersey), in Union City, New Jersey
 Union City High School (Oklahoma) in Union City, Oklahoma
 Union City High School (Pennsylvania) in Union City, Pennsylvania
 Union City High School (Tennessee) in Union City, Tennessee